The following are some of the tribal names in Pakistan. Pakistani surnames are divided into three categories: Islamic naming convention, cultural names and ancestral names.

Baloch tribal names 
 
 

 Bugti
 Buledi
 Bulfati
 Buzdar
 Chandio
 Chhalgari
 Damanis
 Darzada
 Dehwar
 Dewala
 Domki
 Gabol
 Golo
 Gadhi
 Gashkori
 Ghazini
 Gurmani
 Jagirani
 Jamali
 Jarwar
 Jatoi
 Jiskani
 Kalmati
 Kalpar
 Kambarzahi
 Kashani
 Kenagzai
 Khalol
 Khetran
 Khushk
 Korai
 Khara
 Langhani
 Lanjwani
 Loharani
 Lund
 Magsi
 Malik
 Marri
 Mazari
 Mirza
 Mugheri
 Pitafi
 Qaisrani
 Rahija
 Rahmanzai
 Rind
 Ravani 
 Saifi
 Sanjrani
 Satti
 Sherzai
 Shirani
 Syed
 Thingani 
 Talpur
 Umrani
 Wadeyla
 Zardari

Brahui tribal names 
 
 

 Bangulzai tribe 
 Bizenjo tribe
 Bahrani tribe
 Hasni
 Jhalawan
 Khan-e-Qalat
 Kharal
 Kurd
 Lango
 Lehri
 Mirwani
 Mengal
 Muhammad Shahi
 Raisani
 Rodini
 Sarpara
 Sasooli
 Shahwani
 Sumalani

Gujarati clan names 
 
 

Alpial
Bhatia
Lakhani
Memon
Patel

Kashmiri clan names 
 

 Butt
 Dar
 Kashmiri Shaikh
 Khan
 Khawaja
 Lone
 Malik clan (Kashmir)
 Mir
 Wani

Punjabi clan names 
 
 

 Arain
 Aulakh
 Ansari
 Awan
 Bahmani
 Bajwa
 Bangial
 Basra
 Baig
 Bhabra
 Batwal
 Bhati
 Barsar
 Buttar
 Chaudhry
 Chadha, Chattha or Chatha
 Chauhan
 Chughtai
 Derawal
 Dhariwal
 Dhillon
 Dogar
 Duggal
 Gakhar
 Gill
 Grewal
 Gujjar
 Gurmani
 Ibrahim
 Indra
 Iqbal
 Janjua 
 Jatt
 Jutt
 Johiya
 Kathia
 Kahloon
 Khara
 Khan
 Khandowa 
 Kharal
 Khokhar
 Kamboh
 Kirmani
 Sahni
 Khawaja
 Langra
 Langrial
 Lau
 Leel
 Longi
 Machi
 Mahar
 Mahtam
 Makhdoom
 Malik
 Meghwar
 Meo
 Mirza
 Mian
 Mighiana
 Minhas
 Mughal
 Muslim Khatris
 Rajput
 Nanda
 Naqvi
 Paracha
 Parihar
 Passi
 Patel
 Sheikh (Punjabi)
 Qureshi
 Raja
 Ranjha
 Roy
 Sahi clan
 Sangha  
 Sanghera
 Satti
 Sehgal
 Sukhera
 Sethi
 Sirki
 Sangha
 Sheikh
 Shanzay
 Sial
 Siddiqui
 Singh
 Sidhu
 Sandhu
 Shah
 Tiwana
 Tarar
 Uzair
 Virk
 Warraich

Sindhi clan names 
 
 

 Abro
 Arain
 Bhati
 Bhutto
 Chachar
 Chandio (Baloch)
 Hingora
 Hingorja
 Jogi
 Junejo
 Kalhoro
 Kalwar
 Khaskheli
 Khuhro
 Khushk (Baloch)
 Kumbhar
 Lakhani
 Mahar
 Mahar
 Mahesar
 Memon people
 Mirani
 Mirbahar
 Mugheri (Baloch)
 Rind (Baloch) 
 Samma
 Shah
 Shar
 Sheedi
 Siyal
 Soomro
 Wagon

Saraiki tribal names 
 
 

 Ansari
 Arain
 Awan
 Bhait
 Bhati
 Bosan
 Bukhari
 Chachar
 Chandio
 Chughtai            
 Hashmi
 Kalwar
 Khokhar 
 Laar 
 Makhdoom
 Malik
 Noon
 Panwar
 Qureshi 
 Rind
 Ravani 
 Raronjah 
 Shah
 Sial
 Sipra
 Soomro
 Tangwani

Pashtun tribal names 
 
 

 Achakzai 
 Afridi 
 Alizai  
 Akakhel 
 Badrashi
 Bangash
 Banuchi
 Bettani
 Burki
 Chamkanni
 Daulat Khel
 Davi
 Dawar
 Dilazak 
 Dashti
 Durrani
 Ehsan
 Gandapur
 Isa Khel
 Jogezai
 Jadoon 
 Kakakhel
 Kakar
 Kakazai
 Kasi
 Khalil (tribe)
 Kharoti
 Khattak
 Khizarkhel
 Khakwani
 Khudiadadzai
 Khulozai
 Kuchis
 Kundi
 Loharani (khel)
 Lohani (Rohani)
 Lodhi
 Maghdud Khel
 Mahmud Khel
 Mahsud
 Mamund
 Marwat
 Mashwani
 Musakhel
 Miana 
 Mandokhel
 Niazi
 Noorzai
 Orakzai
 Popalzai
 Panni (Balailzai)
 Rouhani
 Swati
 Sadduzai
 Salarzai
 Sarbani
 Shilmani
 Shirani
 Sulemani
 Sulemankhel
 Suri
 Tanoli/Tani
 Tareen
 Tarkani
 Tokhi
 Turkhel
 Umarzai
 Uthman khel
 Wazir
 Wur
 Yousafzai
 Yusaf Khel
 Zimri

Iranian ancestral names 
 
 

 Ansari
 Bukhari
 Chishti
 Fareedi
 Firdausi
 Gardezi
 Ghazali
 Gilani
 Hamadani
 Hameed
 Isfahani
 Jadgal
 Jafari
 Jalali
 Jamshidi
 Kashani
 Kermani
 Askari 
 Mirza
 Montazeri
 Muker
 Nishapuri
 Noorani
 Pirzada
 Qadiri
 Qizilbash
 Razavi
 Reza
 Rizvi
 Sistani
 Yazdani
 Zain
 Zand

Arabic ancestral names 
These surnames are mostly common among Urdu-peaking people and Shia Muslims.
 
 

 Abbasi
 Abidi
 Alvi
 Arain
 Bukhari
 Baqri
 Dhanial
 Farooqi
 Ghazali
 Hashmi
 Hassan
 Hussain
 Hussaini
 Hyder
 Hyderi
 Idrisi
 Jafari
 Jaspal
 Kazmi
 Khagga
 Makhdoom
 Mousavi
 Masood
 Naqvi
 Najafi
 Osmani
 Qazi
 Rizvi
 Sadat
 Saeed
 Saifi
 Sajjadi
 Salehi
 Sayyid
 Shaikh
 Siddiqui
 Taqvi
 Tirmizi
 Turabi
 Usmani
 Wasti
 Zubairi
 Zaidi

Turkic ancestral names 
 
 

 Agha
 Baig
 Barlas
 Effendi
 Gul
 Mirza
 Mughal
 Pasha

References

Family law in Pakistan

Pakistan
Family Names
Pashtun tribes
Sindhi tribes
Saraiki tribes
Punjabi tribes
Hindkowan tribes